Roman Catholic Archdiocese of Valencia may refer to the following Latin Catholic archbishoprics with sees called Valencia:

 Roman Catholic Archdiocese of Valencia in Spain
 Roman Catholic Archdiocese of Valencia in Venezuela

See also 
 Roman Catholic Diocese of Valença, Brazil
 Roman Catholic Diocese of Valence, France